Onjali Qatara Raúf  (born February 1981) is a best-selling British author and the founder of the NGO Making Herstory, a woman's rights organisation tackling the abuse and trafficking of women and girls in the UK.

Background 
Raúf is of British Bangladeshi heritage. Her work is informed in part by her experiences of racism in childhood. "When I started being called Paki, I started to feel [my difference]. I wondered: why is there no one who looks like me in the books? So I wanted to write those characters,” she said in a 2019 interview with The Guardian. Raúf was raised in London.

Career
Raúf's début children's novel published by Orion Children's Books, The Boy at the Back of the Class won numerous awards, drawing on her own experience delivering emergency aid convoys for refugee families surviving in Calais and Dunkirk. Inspired by a Syrian mother and baby she encountered in a Calais refugee camp, it portrays the refugee crisis through the eyes of a child. It was a Sunday Times Bestseller, winner of the 2019 Blue Peter Book Award for Best Story, overall winner of the 2019 Waterstones Children's Book Prize, and nominated for the Carnegie Medal Children's Book Award. In the same year she was also shortlisted for the Jhalak Prize, awarded to the book of the year by a writer of colour and for breakthrough author in the BAMB (Books Are My Bag) Readers' Awards.

Her second book The Star Outside My Window covered hope and resilience in the face of domestic violence through the innocent eyes of 10-year-old girl. This was shortlisted for the inaugural Diverse Book Awards, and 2020 British Book Awards: Books of the Year. It also made the longlist of the UK Literacy Association Book awards. 

She was named as one of the BBC 100 Women, a list and multi-format series of 100 inspiring and influential women from around the world, for 2019. In December 2019 she talked about "Why children are our most powerful hope for change" at TEDxLondonWomen event.

Her 2021 Barrington Stoke publication, The Great (Food) Bank Heist (illustrations by Elisa Paganelli), was a child's perspective on food poverty in the UK.

In addition to writing for publications such as The Guardian, Raúf is also a contributor to the BBC Radio 2 program Pause For Thought.

Raúf was appointed Member of the Order of the British Empire (MBE) in the 2022 New Year Honours for services to literature and women's rights.

List of works
 The Boy at the Back of the Class (2018)
 The Star Outside My Window (2019)
 The Day We Met the Queen (2020)
 The Night Bus Hero (2020)
 The Great (Food) Bank Heist (2021)
 The Lion Above the Door (2021)
 Hope on the Horizon: A children's handbook on empathy, kindness and making a better world (2022)

Awards 

 2019 Blue Peter Book Award, Best Story: The Boy at the Back of the Class
 2019 Waterstones Children's Book Prize, Younger Fiction and Overall Winner: The Boy at the Back of the Class
She was appointed a Member of the Order of the British Empire (MBE) in the 2022 New Year Honours.

References 

She wrote 11 books

External links
 MAKING HERSTORY

1981 births
21st-century English writers
English children's writers
British women's rights activists
Living people
Founders of charities
BBC 100 Women
Members of the Order of the British Empire
Writers from London
English people of Bangladeshi descent